Ahmed Yasser may refer to:

Ahmed Yasser (footballer, born 1994), Qatari footballer
Ahmed Yasser (footballer, born 1991), Egyptian footballer